Sir Guilford Clyde Young KBE (10 November 1916 – 16 March 1988) was an Australian Roman Catholic clergyman.

Born at Sandgate, Queensland, he was ordained priest in Rome on 3 June 1939, after a brilliant academic career at Propaganda Fide College. Returning to Australia he was appointed secretary to the Apostolic Delegation for a short time until he was consecrated Auxiliary Bishop of the Archdiocese of Canberra-Goulburn in St Mary's Cathedral, Sydney, on 8 September 1948.

He was translated to Hobart as Coadjutor in November 1954, and succeeded to the See on the resignation of Archbishop Ernest Victor Tweedy in September the following year. Archbishop Young's years in Hobart were distinguished by his leadership in the implementation of the reforms of the Second Vatican Council and his contribution to the liturgical renewal of the Church, both at the local level and through his appointment in Rome, first to the papal commission for the implementation of the Sacrosanctum Concilium, and later to the Sacred Congregation for Divine Worship.

Honours
In the Queen's Birthday Honours of 1978, Archbishop Young was appointed a Knight Commander of the Order of the British Empire (KBE).

References

External links
Catholic-Hierarchy.org
Archdiocese of Hobart

1916 births
1988 deaths
People from Brisbane
Roman Catholic archbishops of Hobart
20th-century Roman Catholic archbishops in Australia
Australian Knights Commander of the Order of the British Empire